Klaus vom Bruch (born 1952 in Cologne) is a German media artist who is considered a pioneer of German video art.

Biography
Vom Bruch studied conceptual art at the California Institute of the Arts with John Baldessari from 1975 to 1976, and philosophy at the University of Cologne from 1976 to 1980. With Ulrike Rosenbach and Marcel Odenbach he formed the art group ATV. An early video by vom Bruch, "Schleyerband," contains television clips from 1977 and 1978, with footage of the Red Army Faction. From 1992 to 1998, he taught media art at the University of Arts in Karlsruhe (Hochschule für Gestaltung). Since 1999, he is a professor for media art at the Academy of Fine Arts Munich. In 2000, he was a visiting professor at Columbia University in New York.

Awards 
 1986: Dorothea von Stetten Art Award

Important exhibitions
Biennale di Venezia, 1984
Düsseldorf, Von hier aus, 1984
New York, New Museum of Contemporary Art, 1986
"Coventry War Requiem" (video installation); Kassel, documenta 8, 1987
Long Beach, California, 1988

References

1952 births
New media artists
German installation artists
Living people
German video artists
Academic staff of the Academy of Fine Arts, Munich
Academic staff of the Karlsruhe University of Arts and Design